Anjanaharibe-Sud Special Reserve is a wildlife reserve in the north-east of Madagascar. The reserve was designated in 1958 and contains some of the last intact primary rainforest, along with several, rare and endemic animals and plants. The area was nominated to the UNESCO Tentative List of World Heritage Sites in Madagascar in 2008, as an extension of the rainforests of the Atsinanana.

Geography
Two rivers cross the Anjanaharibe-Sud Reserve: the Fotsialanana River and the Marolakana River, which flow into the river of Ankaibe.

The park headquarters is located in Andapa. Access is difficult and the best way to visit is by 4x4.

Flora and fauna
One of the rarest species is a small tree with aromatic leaves,  Takhtajania perrieri, which is classified as an endangered species by the International Union for Conservation of Nature (IUCN). The tree is estimated to have evolved 120 million years ago.

There are twelve species of lemurs in the reserve, 120 species of birds, 55 species of amphibians and forty species of reptiles.

See also
 Marojejy National Park
 Sava Region

References

External links
Friends of Anjanaharibe-Sud Special Reserve
Duke Lemur SAVA Conservation
Homepage of the park administration
Lemur Conservation Foundation

1958 establishments in Madagascar
Special reserves of Madagascar
Protected areas established in 1958
Sava Region
Madagascar subhumid forests
Important Bird Areas of Madagascar